Ralph Cleworth QC (31 October 1896 – 22 October 1975), was a British lawyer and Liberal Party politician.

Background
Cleworth was born the son of Rev. William Enoch Cleworth. He was educated at Wheelwright Grammar School for Boys, Dewsbury and Christ's College, Cambridge. In 1928 he married Eleanore Greenwood. They had one son.

Professional career
Cleworth received a Call to the bar in 1924. He worked as a barrister on the North-Eastearn Circuit. He became a Queens Counsel in 1947.

Political career
In 1927 Cleworth was Liberal candidate for Armley & Wortley in the Leeds County Borough elections. He was in a three-party contest with Labour and Conservative. He came third polling 15% of the vote. In 1929 he was Liberal candidate for the Leeds West division of Yorkshire at the UK General Election. Leeds West was a Labour/Unionist marginal that Labour had won in 1923 and 1924. Cleworth's prospects were not good and he finished a distant third as expected. He did not stand for parliament again.

Electoral record

References

1896 births
1975 deaths
Liberal Party (UK) parliamentary candidates
Alumni of Christ's College, Cambridge
Members of the Middle Temple
20th-century King's Counsel